Monster literature is a genre of literature that combines good and evil and intends to evoke a sensation of horror and terror in its readers by presenting the evil side in the form of a monster.

History
The themes and concepts of Monster Literature are rooted in 18th century Gothic literature. The earliest examples of Gothic literature can be traced all the way back to English author Horace Walpole's novel The Castle of Otranto (1764). However, monster literature first emerged in the 19th century with the release of Mary Shelley's Frankenstein (1818). Gothic literature includes elements of horror and terror as well as a victim who is helpless against his enemy or victimizer. This victimizer usually possesses some form of supernatural power or advantage over the victim, and uses it to cause strife in the life of the victim. In Monster literature, the victimizer is portrayed in the form of a monster that torments the protagonists. In addition, Gothic inspired Monster literature evokes extreme emotions of sorrow, desolation, and isolation.

Frankenstein
In Mary Shelley's Frankenstein, Victor Frankenstein, driven by his insatiable desire for knowledge and enlightenment, creates a monster using body parts from deceased criminals in an attempt to make the perfect human being, one who is stronger and smarter than all others. Shortly after, Frankenstein regrets his creation and deserts it. The monster, endowed with superhuman strength and speed, torments Victor and his closest friends. The monster incites fear in Dr. Frankenstein as well as in the minds of villagers in the surrounding towns. The reader develops a sense of anger and disgust towards the monster for his actions against Dr. Frankenstein and his family but simultaneously feels sympathy for the monster because it is alone and unloved.

Strange Case of Dr Jekyll and Mr Hyde
In Robert Louis Stevenson's Strange Case of Dr. Jekyll and Mr. Hyde (1886), a lawyer named Mr. Utterson speaks with his friend Richard Enfield about an encounter he had with a repulsive hunchbacked man named Mr. Hyde. Soon Utterson finds that one of his clients, Dr. Jekyll, has written his will, giving all of his property to this strange man.  It is revealed that Jekyll and Hyde are in fact one and the same, and that Jekyll has been using a potion he formulated to go between the two personalities. Hyde torments the town, while Jekyll apologizes and humbles his friends for Hyde's sake. Stevenson's novel invites hatred towards Hyde and shock upon the discovery of Jekyll's dual personality.

Dracula
In Bram Stoker's Dracula (1897), Jonathan Harker travels to Count Dracula's castle. Dracula inquires about buying a house in England, but soon Jonathan finds himself Dracula's prisoner. Harker escapes, but Dracula, recognized as a vampire, soon ventures away from his castle and begins to torment others close to Jonathan. Dracula is endowed with the power to turn into a bat, command wolves, and have incredible strength among other traits. However, Dracula and other vampires in the novel are weakened during the day and are repulsed by garlic and the crucifix. Dracula bites one of Johnathan's closest friends, Lucy Westenra, so Dr. Van Helsing calls upon various strong men to donate their blood to help cure her illness. Lucy dies from the sickness, but returns one night and begins tormenting people in the town. Soon, the doctors realize they must kill Lucy by driving a stake into her heart and cut off her head, for she has turned into a vampire. The vampires' actions mystify and torment the humans throughout the novel, causing grief and terror.

I Am Legend
In Richard Matheson's I Am Legend (1954), Robert Neville is the last human alive on Earth. He secludes himself in his home, fortified with iron doors, mirrors, and garlic to keep away the infected vampire-like beings that remain after a mysterious infection has spread among the living creatures on earth. These infected beings, like vampires, only appear at night and taunt Neville with sexual promiscuity to come out of his home so they can suck his blood.  Neville struggles with loneliness and a sense of desolation after losing his wife and daughter in a plane crash while trying to escape the epidemic, and combats these emotions with a constant stream of alcohol. Neville frequently reminisces about his most gut wrenching experiences, such as killing his own dog after she became infected. The reader is constantly sympathizing with Neville, as he is portrayed as helpless and isolated, lacking any real chance of living a pleasant life. The reader feels an overwhelming sensation of hopelessness, sadness, and sympathy for Neville.

Annihilation 
In Jeff VanderMeer’s Annihilation (2014), the first novel in his Southern Reach trilogy, a team of four women venture out into a mysterious and ominous environment called Area X. Though Area X is named, the four women are not, which later contributes to a sense of dehumanization and thus monstrosity within the novel. Indeed, the monsters within Annihilation do not appear as recognizable, supernatural monsters, but rather, are described as both human and nonhuman, existing as a monstrous hybrid. An example of this type of monster is the Crawler, which is utterly incomprehensible to the main character, the Biologist, who declares she knows “nothing at all” about nature and life after seeing it. This resistance to interpretation makes the monsters within Area X defined by their connection to humans, rather than their individual attributes. Another example of this portrayal of a monstrous hybrid is that of the moaning creature within Area X. While the protagonists hear its moaning throughout the novel, it is only at its end that the Biologist fully realizes that the moaning sounds human and inhuman, and theorizes that the moaning creature “was, or had once been, human.” Therefore, the ways in which Area X appears throughout the novel to physically change who is living inside of it, both human and nonhuman, blurs that boundary between humans and the environment. The effect of this is to create monsters that are too close to humans to be cast off as a supernatural other, as well as use those monsters in order to create a sense of dread within the story. This sense of dread is connected most clearly to the erasure of human exceptionalism, as the characters within Annihilation must struggle to understand that the environment holds power over them, rather than the other way around. This, in that struggle with monstrosity, is the only way they will survive Area X.

Modern works

In earlier works, scientists and doctors were deemed as the most knowledgeable and were trusted by all even if they didn't provide proof for their claims. For example, in Dracula, Dr. Van Helsing claims to understand how vampires function. Without questioning, everyone accepts his proposal that vampires suck human's blood and follow his orders, donating their blood to Lucy.

Modern Monster literature written after World War II differs from earlier works in that modern pieces take on more technical explanations for supernatural occurrences. For example, in I Am Legend, Robert Neville notes to himself that Dracula "was a hodgepodge of superstitions and soap-opera clichés." He disowns prior beliefs about vampires including that they can transform into bats and wolves. These preconceived notions along with others regarding characteristics of vampires, have no scientifically proven data and therefore serve no credence in Neville's mind.

In addition, Monster literature since the turn of the century has been closely tied with the concept of the Anthropocene. The Anthropocene, a geological epoch term coined by Eugene Stoermer and Paul Crutzen in the year 2000, is distinctive in its focus on human’s significant impact on the environment, and the ways in which humans and the environment are connected. The Anthropocene has thus inspired many authors to craft a variety of stories that utilize these concepts of humans and the environment in differing ways, and one such way has been through the reworking of Monster literature. 

In the book, Arts of Living on a Damaged Planet: Ghosts and Monsters of the Anthropocene, monsters are described as useful figures “which to think of the Anthropocene, this time of massive human transformation of multispecies life and their uneven effects…monsters are the wonders of symbiosis and the threats of ecological description.” Therefore, in Monster literature set during the Anthropocene, the monsters are not necessarily supernatural creatures that lurk in the night and prey on humans. Rather, they are often portrayed as being both human and nonhuman, exemplifying the monstrous horror behind this possible interrelation of species, and thus displacing human’s position of power over the environment as well as human exceptionalism in general. Themes of isolation and duality are emphasized, but there is often a lack of any sort of scientific breakthrough in novels, opting instead for the perspective of the environment as exerting control.

Some well-known examples of Anthropocene Monster literature include books by Jeff VanderMeer, as well as Agustina Bazterrica’s Tender is the Flesh. Even retellings, such as T. Kingfisher’s What Moves the Dead, tackle the Anthropocene even while writing in the tradition of Monster literature. A retelling of Edgar Allan Poe’s “The Fall of the House of Usher”, Kingfisher’s novella ensures the surrounding flora and fauna of the house take center stage and become the monstrosity to the human protagonists. By focusing on that “which is outside the anthropocentric,” these modern examples of Monster literature “decenter the human animal and devolve the self into an uncanny weirdness.” In doing so, the Anthropocene brings forth a new kind of monster to discover, explore and analyze.

Common themes

Enlightenment and science

Monster Literature focuses on how science influences the creation and destruction of supernatural evil beings. In Frankenstein, Dr. Frankenstein grows up during the Age of Enlightenment. It inspires him to the point that he is willing to give up love for his passion for science. Using the power of science, he is able to create a monstrous being that threatens the lives of many humans. In Dracula, scientific knowledge is used as the primary means of curing those infected by vampires. The scientists in the novel are highly revered and given everyone's utmost respect. In Strange Case of Dr Jekyll and Mr Hyde, Dr. Jekyll uses science to change his physical and mental appearance to the point when he is masked as an entirely different monstrous being known as Mr. Hyde. In I Am Legend, Robert Neville uses the most recent scientific advancements to search for preventative and curative medicine that will fight the vampire bacteria.

Isolation

Monster Literature exerts feelings of isolation to its characters. For example, in Frankenstein, both Victor Frankenstein and the monster he creates are left isolated after they abandon their family members. Frankenstein obsesses over his scientific revelations and neglects his potential fiancé and the rest of his family. Once he has completed his creation, he abandons the monster leaving it alone to fend for itself. The monster then kills all of Frankenstein's friends and relatives as a means of retaliation leaving both of them dead.

Loneliness

Monster Literature often presents its characters as lonely and helpless beings. In I Am Legend, Robert Neville is the last human on Earth, or so he believes. His only company is the horde of vampires that linger around his house wanting to suck his blood and drain the human qualities from him. Neville suffers from the resonating silence that fills his home every day. He hears no voices and sees no friendly beings. At night he is tormented by the evil creatures outside his home.

Duality

The most obvious example of duality in Monster Literature is in Strange Case of Dr Jekyll and Mr Hyde. By night, Dr. Jekyll turns into Mr. Hyde, his evil and monstrous side, and by day, he returns to his primary identity as Dr. Jekyll. With time, his duality begins to blend and he changes identity spontaneously. Other examples of duality in Monster Literature include vampires' resting state during the day and their evil rampages during the night (seen in both Dracula and I Am Legend).

Prominent examples

 Frankenstein
 Dracula
 Strange Case of Dr Jekyll and Mr Hyde
 I Am Legend: film, novel
 Annihilation

See also
 Dark romanticism
 Gothic fiction
 Horror fiction
 New Thought

References

External links
Gothic Literature on Buzzle.com
The Gothic Novel

Speculative fiction
Horror genresp